The 1995–96 Edmonton Oilers season was the Oilers' 17th season in the NHL, and they were coming off a 17–27–4 record, earning 38 points, in the lockout shortened 1994–95 season, missing the playoffs for the 3rd straight season.

During the off-season, the Oilers and St. Louis Blues would complete a trade that saw Edmonton acquire goaltender Curtis Joseph and the rights of Mike Grier in exchange for a 1st round draft pick in both 1996 and 1997. Joseph and the Oilers could not come to a contract agreement, and he would start the season with the Las Vegas Thunder of the IHL. The Oilers also would bring back Glenn Anderson, whom they traded in 1991, as he signed as a free agent, however, he would be dealt to the Blues midway through the season.

As the Oilers would struggle badly early in the season, sitting with a 14–23–6 record at the time of the signing, the team and Joseph agreed to a contract in early January, and Edmonton would then trade their other #1 goaltender, Bill Ranford, to the Boston Bruins for Sean Brown, Mariusz Czerkawski and the Bruins 1st round pick in 1996. Edmonton would play better defensive hockey after the trade, as Joseph would post a 15–16–2 record, however, it was not enough for the Oilers to make the playoffs, as they finished 10 points behind the 8th place Winnipeg Jets.

Offensively, Doug Weight became the first Oiler since Mark Messier in 1989–90 to reach the 100-point plateau, as Weight would record 104 points. Zdeno Ciger scored a team-high 31 goals, while Jason Arnott scored 28 goals and 59 points despite missing 18 games due to injuries. Boris Mironov led the defense with 32 points, while fellow blueliner Jeff Norton would earn 20 points in 30 games after being acquired from St. Louis.

In goal, Bill Ranford would get most of the action until early January, winning 13 games and posting a 3.84 GAA, then Curtis Joseph stepped in and led the Oilers in wins at 15, and posted a team best 3.44 GAA.

Season standings

Schedule and results

Player statistics

Scoring leaders

Goaltending

Awards and records

Awards

Records
1,292: A new Oilers record for most penalty minutes in a career by Kelly Buchberger on December 20, 1995.
424:: A new Oilers record for most games played in a career by a goaltender by Bill Ranford on December 9, 1995.

Milestones

Transactions

Trades

Free agents

Draft picks
Edmonton's draft picks at the 1995 NHL Entry Draft

References
National Hockey League Guide & Record Book 2007

Edmonton Oilers season, 1995-96
Edmon
Edmonton Oilers seasons